Sukhwinder Singh is a former Indian footballer and football manager. He was the manager of the Cuttack based Indian Women's League side, Rising Students for the 2013–14 season and was also the coach of the India U-23 side and formerly of the Pailan Arrows of the I-League.

After completing his coaching course from National Institute of Sports in Patiala, Singh was appointed chief coach of JCT on 1 July 1992. He also served as deputy general manager and joint secretary of the Phagwara-based club.

Playing career
Singh represented Punjab at the Santosh Trophy and won first title in 1974–75 season, when the team was managed by Jarnail Singh. They finished the tournament having scored 46 goals.

Managerial career
Singh managed the Indian senior team from 1999 to 2001 alongside managing JCT FC from 1995 to 2001. He joined JCT as head coach during the managership of Inder Singh. The club at that time became one of the most successful clubs in the country, winning Federation Cup twice in 1995 and 1996, inaugural National Football League in 1996–97, IFA Shield in 1996. He also guided them in continental tournament at the 1996–97 and reached second round.

His notable achievements include the SAFF Cup 1999 win with the Indian senior team, the SAFF Cup 2009 with the India U-23 team and the 1996–97 National Football League victory with JCT FC. He last managed I-League side Churchill Brothers.

Sukhwinder Singh is best remembered for India's performance in 2002 World Cup Qualifiers, where they defeated teams like United Arab Emirates, Brunei and Yemen. India secured 11 points from 6 matches, same as Yemen, but finished behind them due to an inferior goal difference. Only UAE qualified for the next round. Even though they did not make it to the second round, India's performance was commendable.

India started the campaign with solitary goal (by Jules Alberto) win over the mighty UAE at Bangalore. The men in blue defeated Brunei twice, one of which was a lopsided 5–0 win at home. They successfully held Yemen to draws in both the matches. They lost only one game in the entire qualifying phase which was against UAE in an away encounter. If India had managed to beat Yemen in at least one of the ties, they would have surpassed UAE and qualified for the next stages.

In July 2000, Sukhwinder Singh managed India during their historic England-tour, where they played three matches against English Premier League sides Fulham, West Bromwich Albion, and arch-rival Bangladesh.

Singh later went on to manage Pailan Arrows, and also became technical director of the club. He guided the team in 2011 Indian Federation Cup, in which they finished second in group stages behind Salgaocar. In February 2012, he parted ways with the club.

Honours

Player

India
Afghanistan Republic Day Cup third place: 1976, 1977
King's Cup third place: 1977

Punjab
Santosh Trophy: 1974–75, 1980–81

Manager
National Football League: 1996–97
Punjab State Super Football League: 1995; runners-up: 1999
Federation Cup: 1995, 1996
Durand Cup: 1996
IFA Shield: 1996
Rovers Cup: 1997
Indian Super Cup runner-up: 1997
Gurdarshan Memorial Cup: 1995, 2001
Sait Nagjee Football Tournament: 1995
Scissors Cup: 1995
Shaheed-e-Azam Sardar Bhagat Singh Memorial Trophy runner-up: 1998

India
SAFF Championship: 1999

India U23
 SAFF Championship: 2009

See also

History of the India national football team
 List of India national football team managers

References

External links
Sukhwinder Singh profile at JCT (archived on 19 September 2020)
Sukhwinder Singh profile at the-aiff.com (archived on 3 January 2010)

Indian footballers
India international footballers
Indian football coaches
Indian football managers
India national football team managers
Pailan Arrows managers
Churchill Brothers FC Goa managers
I-League managers
Footballers from Hoshiarpur
1949 births
Living people
Association football defenders
Indian Arrows FC managers